RCS2 J2327 (also identified as RCS2 J2327-0204) is an extremely massive galaxy cluster. It is located approximately 6.4 billion light-years away in the constellation of Pisces, thus making it one of the farthest clusters away from Earth. Recent studies have shown that the galaxy cluster has the mass of two quadrillion suns, making it the second-most-massive galaxy cluster. The galaxies are known to be distorted by gravitational lensing, which can have the ability to deflect distort, and amplify the light from the objects behind it. It can also be observed in strong lens, weak lens, and microlens and has 85% invisible dark matter.

References 

Galaxy clusters
Pisces (constellation)